James Harris (born 1948) is an American communist politician and member of the National Committee of the Socialist Workers Party. He was the party's candidate for President of the United States in 1996, receiving 8,463 votes, and again in 2000, receiving 7,378 votes. Harris also served as an alternate candidate for Róger Calero in 2004 and 2008 in states where Calero could not qualify for the ballot due to being born in Nicaragua. More recently Harris was the SWP candidate in the 2009 Los Angeles mayoral election, receiving 2,057 votes (0.89%).

Harris served for a time as the national organization secretary of the SWP. He was a staff writer for the socialist newsweekly  The Militant  in New York. He wrote about the internal resistance to South African apartheid and in 1994 traveled to South Africa to attend the Congress of South African Trade Unions convention. In July 2012, Harris was named the Socialist Workers Party nominee for president, with Maura DeLuca as the vice presidential nominee.

Life and career
Born into a working-class, African American family in Cleveland, Ohio, Harris first became politically active in the civil rights movement. With growing protests against racist discrimination, tens of thousands of Black families in the city staged a school strike in the early 1960s, setting up "Freedom Schools" to study African-American history.

On graduating from high school, Harris attended Cleveland State University, where he was a founding member of the Black Student Union. He organized fellow students into demonstrations opposing the Vietnam War as well as actions against racist practices of the college, which then had only a small percentage of Black students. He became a member of the Student Mobilization Committee Against the War in Vietnam and later served on its national staff in Washington, D.C.

Through these experiences he joined and later became a leader of the Young Socialist Alliance. He ran for school board in Cleveland on the Socialist Workers ticket in 1969, and soon after joined the Socialist Workers Party.

A supporter of the Cuban revolution, Harris participated in the second Venceremos Brigade to Cuba in 1969 along with hundreds of other youth from the United States. Brigade members cut sugar cane for a couple of months in an expression of solidarity with the efforts by millions of working people in Cuba to maximize sugar production. Working alongside Cuban workers and meeting volunteers from Vietnam, Korea, and elsewhere deepened his sense of internationalism.

Harris moved to Atlanta in the early 1970s, and joined in the struggles of the Black community against police brutality. At the time, a number of young Blacks had been killed by police SWAT squad units. Later Harris helped mobilize supporters of Black rights in Atlanta to join actions in Boston in the battle for busing and school desegregation in that city.

In 1977 Harris moved to New York City to join the staff of the National Student Coalition Against Racism, which had helped lead mobilizations for school desegregation. He became a national chairperson of the coalition.

Harris later worked in a garment factory in Los Angeles, as the SWP deepened its industrial base by building units of party members in the garment unions. In Los Angeles he was the chairperson of the SWP in the city.

He also participated in brigades to defend the Nicaraguan revolution in the mid-1980s, and joined a delegation to visit revolutionary Grenada in the early 1980s.

In 1988 Harris was the Socialist Workers Party candidate in New York for the United States Senate. Harris finished seventh with 11,239 votes.

Harris lived and worked in Detroit in the early 1990s and was a member of the United Auto Workers there. He helped broaden solidarity with labor struggles such as those of workers on strike against Caterpillar. Harris spent several months in Peoria, Illinois, helping establish a branch of the Socialist Workers Party there in response to the battle by members of the UAW against Caterpillar.

Harris is a strong critic of the death penalty and he has been active in a struggle against police brutality in Valdosta, Georgia, and has participated in activity with the People's Tribunal, an organization centered on death of Willie James Williams, killed while in police custody in that southern Georgia town.

References

External links
The Militant, weekly paper of the Socialist Workers Party
Pathfinder Books, the bookstore of the Socialist Workers Party

1948 births
Living people
African-American candidates for President of the United States
American anti–Vietnam War activists
American anti-war activists
Cleveland State University alumni
Politicians from Cleveland
Socialist Workers Party (United States) presidential nominees
Candidates in the 1996 United States presidential election
Candidates in the 2000 United States presidential election
20th-century American politicians
Candidates in the 2004 United States presidential election
Candidates in the 2008 United States presidential election
Candidates in the 2012 United States presidential election
21st-century American politicians
20th-century African-American politicians
African-American men in politics
21st-century African-American politicians